Ivan Kensorinovich Gryaznov (Russian: Иван Кенсоринович Грязнов; 1891 – 29 July 1938) was a Soviet Komkor. He was born in what is now Sverdlovsk Oblast. He was a recipient of the Order of the Red Banner. He was executed during the Great Purge.

Bibliography
 Алексеев Д. Г. Начдив Иван Грязнов. Свердловск, 1968.
 Варгин Н. Ф. Комкор Иван Грязнов. M , 1971,

External links
 Варианты биографии на сайте Хронос
 Репрессии в Красной Армии

1891 births
1938 deaths
Gryaznov
Recipients of the Order of the Red Banner
Great Purge victims from Russia